Black Cars is the eighth album by Gino Vannelli. Produced with his brothers Joe and Ross, the album yielded two hit singles:  the title track and "Hurts to Be in Love".

Vannelli was nominated for the 1986 Juno Award for Male Vocalist of the Year, an award he won in 1979. He and Joe won the 1986 Juno Award for Recording Engineer of the Year for the title track.

Track listing

Singles
The following singles were released from the album, with the highest charting positions listed.

Personnel 
 Gino Vannelli – lead vocals, guitars (1, 3, 7, 8), backing vocals (2, 4, 7), drums (3, 6, 9), drum programming (7), percussion (9)
 Joe Vannelli – synthesizers, synth bass (2, 4, 8, 9), acoustic piano (3, 7, 9), electric piano (6, 9), drum programming (7)
 Mike Miller – guitars (2, 4, 5, 6), lead guitar (3, 7), acoustic guitar (8)
 Jimmy Haslip – bass guitar (1, 4-7)
 David Garibaldi – drums (1)
 Mark Craney – drums (2, 4, 5, 8)
 Ross Vannelli – backing vocals (2-6, 9), bass guitar (3), drum programming (7), percussion (7)
 John Messerschmidt – backing vocals (2)
 Lori Lieberman – backing vocals (9)

Production 
 Produced and Arranged by Gino Vannelli, Joe Vannelli and Ross Vannelli.
 Engineers – Gino Vannelli, Joe Vannelli and Ron Capone.
 Mastered by Bernie Grundman at Bernie Grundman Mastering (Hollywood, CA).
 Album Coordinator – Shirley Klein
 Art Direction and Design – Michael Hodgson
 Photography – Moshea Brakha
 Styling – Maria Sarno
 Management – Patrick Raines & Associates.

References

External links
 

Gino Vannelli albums
1984 albums
Polydor Records albums